The Ambassador of the United Kingdom to Saudi Arabia is the United Kingdom's foremost diplomatic representative in Saudi Arabia, and in charge of the UK's diplomatic mission in Saudi Arabia.  The official title is His Britannic Majesty's Ambassador to the Kingdom of Saudi Arabia.

List of heads of mission

Envoy Extraordinary and Minister Plenipotentiary
1930–1936: Sir Andrew Ryan
1936–1939: Sir Reader Bullard
1940–1943: Hugh Stonehewer-Bird
1943–1945: Stanley Jordan
1945–1947: Sir Laurence Grafftey-Smith

Ambassador Extraordinary and Plenipotentiary
1947–1951: Alan Trott
1951–1955: Clinton Pelham
1955: Harold Beeley
1955–1956: Roderick Parkes
1956–1963: Diplomatic relations severed due to Suez Crisis
1963–1964: Sir Colin Crowe
1964–1968: Morgan Man
1968: Horace Phillips (rejected by Saudi government)
1968–1972: Sir Willie Morris
1972–1976: Sir Alan Rothnie
1976–1979: Sir John Wilton
1979–1984: Sir James Craig
1984–1986: Sir Patrick Wright
1986–1989: Sir Stephen Egerton
1989–1993: Sir Alan Munro 
1993–1996: Sir David Gore-Booth
1996–2000: Sir Andrew Green
2000–2003: Sir Derek Plumbly
2003–2006: Sir Sherard Cowper-Coles 
2006–2010: Sir William Patey
2010–2012: Sir Tom Phillips
2012–2015: Sir John Jenkins 
2015–2020: Simon Collis

2020–: Neil Crompton

References

External links
UK and Saudi Arabia, gov.uk

Saudi Arabia
 
United Kingdom